Dutch singer Esmée Denters has released one studio album, three extended plays (EP) and twenty singles (including three as featured artist). Denters rose to prominence after posting song covers on YouTube, which gained the attention of American singer Justin Timberlake who signed her to his record label Tennman Records in 2007. In November of the same year, she released the promotional single "Crazy Place".

Her debut single "Outta Here" was released in 2009. It peaked at number two on the Dutch Single Top 100 and within the top ten in the United Kingdom and on the US Billboard Dance Club Songs chart. The song was certified gold in New Zealand and silver in the United Kingdom. Denters's debut studio album, Outta Here (2009), peaked at number five in the Netherlands. Two more singles were released off the album"Admit It" (2009) and "Love Dealer" (2010)the latter becoming Denters's second song to peak in the top ten of the Dance Club Songs chart. In 2010, Denters featured on Chipmunk's "Until You Were Gone". The single became Denters's highest peaking song in the United Kingdom, reaching number three and further being certified silver. She was also a featured artist on "Life Without You" (2010) by Stanfour, which charted in German-speaking countries.

In 2012, Denters was dropped from Timberlake's label. In the same year, 3 Beat Records released her single "It's Summer Because We Say So", credited under the mononym Esmée. Alongside The New Velvet in April 2013, Denters released the collaborative EP From Holland to Hillside. Also in 2013, she joined other Dutch artists to perform "Koningslied" as a gift for King Willem-Alexander. It debuted at number one on the Dutch Single Top 100. Her 2014 single "If I Could I Would" was released independently. Denters announced in 2015 that she planned to release an EP but would require funds via crowdfunding on the music platform PledgeMusic. The project did not materialise as the goal was not met. She later issued two EPs independently, These Days (2017) and These Days, Pt. 2 (2018).

Albums

Extended plays

Singles

As lead artist

As featured artist

Promotional singles

Other singles

Guest appearances

Notes

References

External links
 Esmée Denters official website
 Esmée Denters at AllMusic
 

Discographies of Dutch artists